Lala-Roba ( Gworam) is an Adamawa language of Nigeria. Its name is a compound of two of its dialects, Lala (Lalla), Roba (Robba), and Ebode.

Blench (2019) lists Lala, Roba, Ebode, and Yang as varieties.

References

Languages of Nigeria
Bambukic languages